Luboš Jíra (born April 2, 1990) is a Czech luger who has competed since 2000. He finished 15th in the men's doubles event at the FIL European Luge Championships 2010 in Sigulda.

Jíra qualified for the 2010 Winter Olympics where he finished 18th.

References
 FIL-Luge profile

External links
 

1990 births
Living people
Czech male lugers
Olympic lugers of the Czech Republic
Lugers at the 2010 Winter Olympics